The following is a list of the 31 cantons of the Loire-Atlantique department, in France, following the French canton reorganisation which came into effect in March 2015:

 Ancenis-Saint-Géréon
 La Baule-Escoublac
 Blain
 Carquefou
 La Chapelle-sur-Erdre
 Châteaubriant
 Clisson
 Guémené-Penfao
 Guérande
 Machecoul-Saint-Même
 Nantes-1
 Nantes-2
 Nantes-3
 Nantes-4
 Nantes-5
 Nantes-6
 Nantes-7
 Nort-sur-Erdre
 Pontchâteau
 Pornic
 Rezé-1
 Rezé-2
 Saint-Brevin-les-Pins
 Saint-Herblain-1
 Saint-Herblain-2
 Saint-Nazaire-1
 Saint-Nazaire-2
 Saint-Philbert-de-Grand-Lieu
 Saint-Sébastien-sur-Loire
 Vallet
 Vertou

References